Something New is an album by English rock band the Beatles, released in 1964 for the North American market only.

The album is the third Capitol LP release and fifth American album release overall by the band, following the United Artists release of A Hard Day's Night. The album includes eight songs from the original British release of A Hard Day's Night, as well as the tracks "Slow Down" and "Matchbox" from the Long Tall Sally EP and the German-language version of "I Want to Hold Your Hand". The mono version also featured the extended single mix of "I'll Cry Instead", while stereo editions included a shorter edit from the UK release of A Hard Day's Night.

Release history 
Originally scheduled for 1 August 1964, the album was rush-released on 20 July 1964, ten days after the British release of A Hard Day's Night.  It was released in both mono and stereo versions. All mono mixes of the five songs duplicated from the United Artists soundtrack album are identical on both releases. Something New was the only early Capitol Beatles album to contain all tracks in true stereo. The mono release contains alternative versions of "Any Time At All" (a different mix during the instrumental bridge), "I'll Cry Instead" (with the "missing" third verse), "When I Get Home" (the line "Till I walk out that door again" during the song's bridge has a different vocal passage from the UK mono mix), "If I Fell" (Lennon's non-double-tracked introductory vocal), and "And I Love Her" (McCartney's non-double-tracked vocal).

This album was also released on the Parlophone label for sale only on American Armed Forces bases in Europe. These copies have great collector value. The album was also issued in Germany on the Odeon label. The German stereo version contains a reprocessed stereo version of "Komm, Gib Mir Deine Hand" and an extended version of "And I Love Her", repeating the closing riff six times instead of four. This mix was later released on the US version of Rarities.

In 2004, Something New  was released for the first time on CD as part of The Capitol Albums, Volume 1 box set (catalogue number CDP 7243 8 66876 2 3) containing the US mixes for both mono and stereo. In 2014, the album  was released on CD again, both individually, and included in the boxed set The US Albums, which contained the album's running order but with UK mixes as remastered in 2009.

Reception 

The album spent nine weeks at No. 2 on the Billboard Top LPs chart in 1964, behind the United Artists A Hard Day's Night album.

Something New was included in Robert Christgau's "Basic Record Library" of 1950s and 1960s recordings, published in Christgau's Record Guide: Rock Albums of the Seventies (1981).

Personnel
 John Lennon – rhythm guitar, vocals, piano on "Things We Said Today"
 Paul McCartney – bass guitar, vocals
 George Harrison – lead guitar, backing vocals, lead vocals on "I'm Happy Just to Dance With You"
 Ringo Starr – drums, tambourine, bongos and claves on "And I Love Her," lead vocals on "Matchbox"
 George Martin – piano on "Slow Down", "Matchbox" and "Tell Me Why"

Track listing
All tracks written by John Lennon and Paul McCartney (Lennon–McCartney), except where noted.

Note: "I'll Cry Instead" mono version 2:09, stereo version 1:49.

Charts and certifications

In the U.S., the album sold 1,049,243 copies by 31 December 1964 and 1,443,735 copies by the end of the decade.

Chart performance

Certifications

Notes

References

External links

"Something New" album. Recording history. Origin of the album

1964 albums
Albums produced by George Martin
The Beatles albums
Capitol Records albums